Karim Ghajji (born January 16, 1981), is a Moroccan-French kickboxer and B-boy. He is a former Glory Welterweight Championship challenger.

Combat Press ranked him in the welterweight top ten between September 2014 and April 2018.

Biography and career
Karim Ghajji is a boxer of Moroccan origin; he resides in Meaux, France, and is  part of Fantastik Armada. It is one of the fighters of 2009 and 2010.

Karim began karate at the age of 12 years and in parallel, he has learned breakdance with his classmates, because at the time it was fashionable. Gradually, the two disciplines have become important in his life. His trainer is Abel El Quandili.

Turned pro in kickboxing since 3 years, he is now captain of France in the same discipline.

In 2010 he made a great tournament in Dijon at the UKC France MAX and reached the final. He won K1 Pro French title, K1 W.P.M.F European title and F-1 World Max Tournament. On 4 September, he won SportAccord Combat Games gold medal.

He defeated Dmitry Valent via decision at Nuit des Champions in Marseilles on November 24, 2012.

On December 15, 2012, he defeated Luis Reis and Jeremy Ragazzagi, respectively, on points to win the WKN 75 kg Full Contact European Grand Prix at Full Night 6 in Agde, France.

Ghajji caused a major upset by winning the 72.5 kg Muay Thai tournament at La Nuit des Titans in Tours, France on February 2, 2013. In the semi-finals, he had his rubber match with Yohan Lidon and won on points after a close fight. Then, in the final, he knocked out the much-fancied Eakpracha Meenayotin in the first round with a combination of a high kick, straight left, knee and a huge right hand.

Ghajji KO'd Darko Delic at Explosion Fight Night 7 in Châteauroux, France on March 16, 2013.

He made his debut with major kickboxing promotion Glory against Nieky Holzken at Glory 6: Istanbul in Istanbul Turkey on April 6, 2013, losing via TKO due to a cut in an extension round.

Ghajji defeated Yuri Bessmertny via unanimous decision at Time Fight 3 in Tours, France on June 15, 2013.

He was TKO'd by Joseph Valtellini late in round three at Glory 11: Chicago - Heavyweight Championship Tournament in Hoffman Estates, Illinois, United States on October 12, 2013.

He lost to Alexander Stetsurenko by unanimous decision in the Glory 13: Tokyo - Welterweight World Championship Tournament reserve match in Tokyo, Japan on December 21, 2013.

He defended his ISKA title during Final Fight 2, when he defeated Ruben Garcia Gonzales by decision.

Ghajji took part in the 2015 Glory Welterweight Contender Tournament. He won a majority decision against Yoann Kongolo in the semi finals, but lost a unanimous decision to Murthel Groenhart in the finals.

In his next fight, Ghajji fought Mustapha Haida for the inaugural Bellator Kickboxing Welterweight Championship. Karim won by a split decision. He lost the title in his first title defense against Zoltan Laszak by a split decision. The two met again a year later, and Ghajji recaptured the title by a split decision. Ghajji once again failed to defend the Bellator title, as he lost to Raymond Daniels by a first round TKO during Bellator KB 7.

Ghajji defended the ISKA belt two additional times, against Enrico Carrara and Giannis Boukis, to bring his total tally of ISKA title defenses up to 15.

In December 2020, Ghajji was scheduled to fight Cédric Doumbé for the Glory Welterweight Championship, as a late notice replacement for Murthel Groenhart. He lost the title fight by a third round TKO.

Ghajji faced Jordan Zebo in a MMA bout on May 20, 2022 at Ares FC 6. He lost by the way of unanimous decision.

Ghajji faced Ammari Diedrick on January 20, 2023 at Ares FC 11, losing by the way of split decision.

Titles and achievements

Professional:
 International Sport Karate Association
 2019 I.S.K.A. Oriental Rules World Champion (-78 kg) (6 title defences)
 2019 I.S.K.A. Oriental Rules World Champion (-78 kg) (5 title defences)
 2018 I.S.K.A. Oriental Rules World Champion (-78 kg) (4 title defences)
 2014 I.S.K.A. Oriental Rules World Champion (-78 kg) (3 title defences)
 2012 I.S.K.A. Oriental Rules World Champion (-75 kg) (4 title defences)
 Bellator Kickboxing
 2016 Bellator Kickboxing Welterweight Championship (Two time)
 Glory
 2015 Glory Welterweight Contender Tournament Runner Up
 La Nuit des Titans
 2013 La Nuit des Titans Tournament champion (-72.5 kg)
 2011 La Nuit des Titans 4 Men K-1 Rules Tournament Champion (-73 kg)
 World Kickboxing Network
 2012 WKN Full Contact European Grand Prix champion (-75 kg)
 Boxe in Défi
 2012 "boxe in défi" tournament champion belt (-76 kg)
 Nuit des Champions
 2011 "Nuit des Champions" Full Contact belt (-76 kg)
 Urban Boxing United
 2011 "Urban Boxing United 2" Super Fight belt
 ProFight Karate
 2010 ProFight Karate Middleweight Tournament Champion
 F-1
 2010 F-1 World Max Tournament Champion (-74 kg)
 World Professional Muaythai Federation
 2010 K1 W.P.M.F. European Champion (-72.5 kg)
 Fédération Française de Sports de Contacts et Disciplines Associées
 2010 FFSCDA K1 Pro French Champion (-72 kg)
 2009 FFSCDA A-Class French Kickboxing Champion (-74 kg)
 UKC
 2010 UKC France MAX Tournament Runner Up (-70 kg)
 Others
 2009 Sanda (Chinese Kickboxing) French Champion
 FFKB
 2008 FFKB A-Class French Kickboxing Vice Champion (-74 kg)

Amateur:
 2010 SportAccord World Combat Games Kick-Boxing - Low-Kick Champion  (-75 kg)
 2009 WAKO World Kick-Boxing Championships, Villach Austria  (-75 kg)
 4 times Karate-Contact French Champion
 4 times winner of the Karate-Contact France Cup

Mixed martial arts record

|-
|Loss
|align=center|2–4
|Ammari Diedrick
|Decision (split)
|Ares FC 11
|
|align=center|3
|align=center|5:00
|Paris, France
|
|-
|Loss
|align=center|2–3
|Jordan Zébo
|Decision (unanimous)
|Ares FC 6
|
|align=center|3
|align=center|5:00
|Paris, France
|
|-
|Loss
|align=center|2–2
|Marek Jakimowicz
|TKO (punches and elbows)
|Ares FC 4
|
|align=center|1
|align=center|4:43
|Paris, France
|
|-
|Win
|align=center|2–1
|Wallace Felipe
|Submission (rear-naked choke)
|MMA Grand Prix 1
|
|align=center|2
|align=center|3:59
|Vitry-sur-Seine, France
|
|-
|Win
|align=center|1–1
|Laïd Zerhouni
|Submission (triangle choke)
|Octogone: 2nd Edition
|
|align=center|1
|align=center|2:29
|Marseille, France
|
|-
|Loss
|align=center|0–1
|Manuel Vincent-Sully
|Decision (Unanimous)
|100% Fight: Contenders 8
|
|align=center|2
|align=center|5:00
|Paris, France

Kickboxing record

|-
|-  bgcolor="#fbb"
| 2020-12-19 || Loss ||align=left| Cédric Doumbé || Glory 76: Rotterdam || Rotterdam, Netherlands || TKO (Punches) || 3 || 1:30
|-
! style=background:white colspan=9 |
|-
|-  bgcolor="#CCFFCC"
| 2019-12-12 || Win || align="left" | Giannis Boukis|| Triumph Fighting Tour III ||Paris, France|| Decision || 5 || 3:00
|-
! colspan="9" style="background:white" |
|-  bgcolor="#CCFFCC"
| 2019-11-09 || Win || align="left" | Kristos Cacaj|| Meaux Fight 8 ||Meaux, France|| TKO(corner stoppage)|| 2 || 3:00
|-
|-  bgcolor="#CCFFCC"
| 2019-06-13 || Win || align="left" | Jordi Fernandez|| Triumph Fighting Tour II ||Paris, France|| KO (Low kick) || 4 || 2:44
|-
|-|-  bgcolor="#CCFFCC"
| 2019-02-16 || Win || align="left" | Alcorac Caballero|| K1 Event 12 ||Troyes, France|| Decision || 3 || 3:00
|-
|-  bgcolor="#FFBBBB"
| 2018-12-01|| Loss|| align="left" |  Yuri Bessmertny||Bellator Kickboxing 11||Italy|| Decision (Unanimous) || 3 || 3:00
|-
|-  bgcolor="#CCFFCC"
| 2018-09-22 || Win || align="left" | Enrico Carrara|| Le Trophée Des Etoiles ||Aix En Provence, France|| KO (Low kick) || 3 || 3:00
|-
! colspan="9" style="background:white" |
|-
|-  bgcolor="#FFBBBB"
| 2018-05-05 || Loss || align="left" | Diogo Calado || Capital Fights 3 ||France|| Extra Round Decision || 4 || 3:00
|-
|-  bgcolor="#FFBBBB"
| 2017-09-23 || Loss || align="left" | Raymond Daniels||Bellator Kickboxing 7||San Jose, California, USA|| TKO (doctor stoppage) || 1 || 3:00
|-
! colspan="9" style="background:white" |
|-
|-  bgcolor="#CCFFCC"
| 2017-04-14 || Win || align="left" | Zoltan Laszak||Bellator Kickboxing 6||Budapest, Hungary|| Decision (Split) || 5 || 3:00
|-
! colspan="9" style="background:white" |
|-
|-  bgcolor="#CCFFCC"
| 2016-12-10 || Win || align="left" | Luca Novello ||Bellator Kickboxing 4||Florence, Italy|| Decision (Unanimous) || 3 || 3:00
|-
|-  bgcolor="#FFBBBB"
| 2016-09-17 || Loss || align="left" | Zoltan Laszak||Bellator Kickboxing 3||Budapest, Hungary|| Decision (Split) || 5 || 3:00
|-
! colspan="9" style="background:white" |
|-
|-  bgcolor="#CCFFCC"
| 2016-04-16 || Win || align="left" | Mustapha Haida||Bellator Kickboxing 1||Torino, Italy|| Decision (Split) || 5 || 3:00
|-
! colspan="9" style="background:white" |
|-
|-  bgcolor="#FFBBBB"
| 2015-11-06 || Loss || align="left" | Murthel Groenhart||Glory 25: Milan - Welterweight Contender Tournament, Final ||Monza, Italy|| Decision (Unanimous) || 3 || 3:00
|-
! colspan="9" style="background:white" |
|-
|-  bgcolor="#CCFFCC"
| 2015-11-06 || Win || align="left" | Yoann Kongolo||Glory 25: Milan - Welterweight Contender Tournament, Semi Finals ||Monza, Italy|| Decision (Majority) || 3 || 3:00
|-  bgcolor="#CCFFCC"
| 2015-04-25 || Win || align="left" | Ruben Garcia Gonzales || Final Fight 2 ||Évreux, France|| Decision || 5 || 3:00
|-
! colspan="8" style="background:white" |
|-  bgcolor="#CCFFCC"
| 2015-04-11|| Win || align="left" | Fabio Siciliani|| Oktagon 2015: 20 Years Edition ||Milan, Italy|| Decision (Unanimous) || 3 || 3:00
|-  bgcolor="#CCFFCC"
| 2015-03-14 || Win || align="left" | Kevin Ward || Duel des maitres II ||Villepinte, France|| Decision || 5 || 3:00
|-
! colspan="8" style="background:white" |
|-
|-  bgcolor="#CCFFCC"
| 2014-12-13 || Win || align="left" | Alexander Stetsurenko|| Victory ||Paris, France|| Decision (Unanimous) || 3 || 3:00
|-
|-  bgcolor="#CCFFCC"
| 2014-30-05 || Win || align="left" | Mustapha Haïda|| Final Fight I||Le Havre, France|| Decision || 5 || 3:00
|-
|-  bgcolor="#CCFFCC"
| 2014-22-03 || Win || align="left" | Dan Balsemao|| Meaux Fight 3 ||Paris, France|| Decision || 5 || 3:00
|-
! colspan="9" style="background:white" |
|-
|-  bgcolor="#CCFFCC"
| 2014-02-01 || Win || align="left" | Nigel Thomas|| Explosion Fight Night 9 ||Châteauroux, France|| Decision || 5 || 3:00
|-
! colspan="9" style="background:white" |
|-
|-  bgcolor="#FFBBBB"
| 2013-12-21 || Loss || align="left" | Alexander Stetsurenko||Glory 13: Tokyo - Welterweight World Championship Tournament, Reserve Match ||Tokyo, Japan|| Decision (unanimous) || 3 || 3:00
|-
|-  bgcolor="#CCFFCC"
| 2013-11-16 || Win || align="left" | Alex Schmitt || Explosion Fight Night 8 ||France|| TKO || 5 || 
|-
! colspan="9" style="background:white" |
|-
|-  bgcolor="#FFBBBB"
| 2013-10-12 || Loss || align="left" | Joseph Valtellini||Glory 11: Chicago - Heavyweight World Championship Tournament||Hoffman Estates, Illinois, USA|| TKO (punches and right high kick) || 3 || 2:53
|-
|-  bgcolor="#CCFFCC"
| 2013-06-15 || Win || align="left" | Yuri Bessmertny|| Time Fight 3 ||Tours, France|| Decision (unanimous) || 3 || 3:00
|-
|-  bgcolor="#FFBBBB"
| 2013-04-06 || Loss || align="left" | Nieky Holzken||Glory 6: Istanbul||Istanbul, Turkey|| TKO (cut) || 4 || 
|-
|-  bgcolor="#CCFFCC"
| 2013-03-16 ||Win || align="left" | Darko Delic|| Explosion Fight Night 7 ||Châteauroux, France|| KO||1 || 
|-
! colspan="9" style="background:white" |
|-
|-  bgcolor="#CCFFCC"
| 2013-02-02 || Win || align="left" | Eakpracha Meenayotin|| La Nuit des Titans, Final ||Tours, France|| KO (left knee and right overhand) || 1 || 
|-
! colspan="9" style="background:white" |
|-
|-  bgcolor="#CCFFCC"
| 2013-02-02 || Win || align="left" | Yohan Lidon|| La Nuit des Titans, Semi Finals ||Tours, France|| Decision || 3 || 3:00
|-
|-  bgcolor="#CCFFCC"
| 2012-12-15 || Win || align="left" | Jeremy Ragazzagi|| Full Night 6, Final ||Agde, France|| Decision || 3 || 3:00
|-
! colspan="9" style="background:white" |
|-
|-  bgcolor="#CCFFCC"
| 2012-12-15 || Win || align="left" | Luis Reis|| Full Night 6, Semi Finals ||Agde, France|| Decision || 3 || 3:00
|-
|-  bgcolor="#CCFFCC"
| 2012-11-24 || Win || align="left" | Dmitry Valent|| Nuit des Champions ||Marseilles, France|| Decision || 5 || 3:00
|-
|-  bgcolor="#CCFFCC"
| 2012-06-09 || Win || align="left" | Patrik Kontraszti|| Gala du Phenix Muaythai 4 ||Trets, France|| KO || 3 || 
|-
! colspan="9" style="background:white" |
|-
|-  bgcolor="#FFBBBB"
| 2012-04-28 || Loss || align="left" | Naruepol Fairtex|| Boxe Thai et K1 Rules à Bagnolet ||Paris, France|| Decision || 5 || 3:00
|-
|-  bgcolor="#CCFFCC"
| 2012-04-07 || Win || align="left" | Francisco Matos|| Explosion Fight Night Volume 05 ||Châteauroux, France|| Decision || 5 || 3:00
|-
! colspan="9" style="background:white" |
|-
|-  bgcolor="#CCFFCC"
| 2012-03-17 || Win || align="left" | Yannick Tamas|| Boxe in défi XIII, Tournament, Final || Muret, France || Decision || 4 || 2:00
|-
! colspan="9" style="background:white" |
|-
|-  bgcolor="#CCFFCC"
| 2012-03-17 || Win || align="left" | Stevan Živković|| Boxe in défi XIII, Tournament, Semi Final || Muret, France || Decision || 3 || 2:00
|-
|-  bgcolor="#CCFFCC"
| 2011-11-12 || Win || align="left" | Sebastien Pace || La 18ème Nuit des Champions ||Marseille, France|| Decision || 7 || 2:00
|-
! colspan="9" style="background:white" |
|-
|-  bgcolor="#CCFFCC"
| 2011-10-01 || Win || align="left" | Karim Benmansour|| F-1 World MAX 2011 ||Meyreuil, France|| Decision ||  || 
|-
|-  bgcolor="#FFBBBB"
| 2011-07-17 || Loss || align="left" | Yodsanklai Fairtex|| Thai Fight Extreme ||Hong Kong, China || Decision || 3 || 3:00
|-
|-  bgcolor="#CCFFCC"
| 2011-05-07 || Win || align="left" | Karim Benmansour|| Urban Boxing United 2 ||Marseilles, France || Decision (unanimous) || 5 || 3:00
|-
! colspan="9" style="background:white" |
|-
|-  bgcolor="#CCFFCC"
| 2011-02-12 || Win || align="left" | Sébastien Billard|| La Nuit des Titans, Tournament, Final ||Tours, France || TKO (corner stoppage) || 3 ||
|-
! colspan="9" style="background:white" |
|-
|-  bgcolor="#CCFFCC"
| 2011-02-12 || Win || align="left" | Tuncay Aydın|| La Nuit des Titans, Tournament, Semi Final ||Tours, France || Decision || 3 || 3:00
|-
|-  bgcolor="#CCFFCC"
| 2010-11-27 || Win || align="left" | Chamil Batchaev|| ProFight Karate Middleweight Tournament, Final ||Toulon, France || Decision ||  || 
|-
! colspan="9" style="background:white" |
|-
|-  bgcolor="#CCFFCC"
| 2010-11-27 || Win || align="left" | Hamza Ridène|| ProFight Karate Middleweight Tournament, Semi Final ||Toulon, France || Decision ||  || 
|-
|-  bgcolor="#CCFFCC"
| 2010-09-25 || Win || align="left" | Yohan Lidon|| F-1 World MAX 2010, Final ||Meyreuil, France || Decision || 3 || 2:00
|-
! colspan="9" style="background:white" |
|-
|-  bgcolor="#CCFFCC"
| 2010-09-25 || Win || align="left" | Samir Dourid|| F-1 World MAX 2010, Semi Final ||Meyreuil, France || TKO || 2 || 
|-
|-  bgcolor="#CCFFCC"
| 2010-09-04 || Win || align="left" | Alpay Kır ||SportAccord World Combat Games, Final -75 kg ||Beijing, China || Decision (3-0) || 3 || 2:00
|-
! colspan="9" style="background:white" |
|-
|-  bgcolor="#CCFFCC"
| 2010-09-03 || Win || align="left" | Kanan Sadikhov ||SportAccord World Combat Games, Semi Finals -75 kg ||Beijing, China|| Decision (3-0) || 3 || 2:00
|-
|-  bgcolor="#CCFFCC"
| 2010-06-19 || Win || align="left" | Yassin Baitar || Explosion Fight Night Volume 01 ||Brest, France|| KO || 5 || 
|-
! colspan="9" style="background:white" |
|-
|-  bgcolor="#CCFFCC"
| 2010-04-30 || Win || align="left" | Mehdi Baghdad || Urban Boxing United ||Marseilles, France || TKO (cut) || 3 || 
|-
! colspan="9" style="background:white" |
|-
|-  bgcolor="#FFBBBB"
| 2010-02-06 || Loss || align="left" | Abdallah Mabel|| UKC France MAX, Final ||Dijon, France || KO (right flying knee) || 2 || 
|-
! colspan="9" style="background:white" |
|-
|-  bgcolor="#CCFFCC"
| 2010-02-06 || Win || align="left" | Marat Grigorian|| UKC France MAX, Semi Final ||Dijon, France || Decision || 3 || 3:00
|-
|-  bgcolor="#CCFFCC"
| 2010-02-06 || Win || align="left" | Jakub Gazdík || UKC France MAX, Quarter Final ||Dijon, France || KO || 1 || 
|-
|-  bgcolor="#CCFFCC"
| 2009-12-12 || Win || align="left" | Sebastien Pace || Full Night III ||Agde, France || KO || 7 || 
|-
|-  bgcolor="#CCFFCC"
| 2009-11-21 || Win || align="left" | Marco Silva || Portugal vs France ||Algarve, Portugal || KO || 3 || 
|-  bgcolor="#FFBBBB"
| 2009-09-26 || Loss || align="left" | Yohan Lidon|| F-1 World MAX 2009, Semi Final ||Meyreuil, France || Decision || 3 || 2:00
|-
|-  bgcolor="#CCFFCC"
| 2009-05-30 || Win || align="left" | Arton Berisha || France vs Germany ||Strasbourg, France || KO || 3 || 3:00
|-
|-  bgcolor="#CCFFCC"
| 2009-04-25 || Win || align="left" | Benjamin Gerbet || French Kickboxing Championships A-Class Elite, Final || Paris, France || Decision || 5 || 2:00
|-
! colspan="9" style="background:white" |
|-
|-  bgcolor="#c5d2ea"
| 2008-12-06 || Draw || align="left" | Sebastien Pace || Full Night II ||Agde, France || Decision draw || 7 || 2:00
|-  bgcolor="#CCFFCC"
| 2008-06-07 || Win || align="left" | Bakari Tounkara || Le Choc des Boxes || Paris, France || Decision (unanimous) || 5 || 2:00
|-
|-  bgcolor="#FFBBBB"
| 2008-04-17 || Loss || align="left" | Bakari Tounkara || French Kickboxing Championships FFKB A-Class, Final || Paris, France || Decision || 5 || 2:00
|-
! colspan="9" style="background:white" |
|-
|-  bgcolor="#CCFFCC"
| 2008-03-08 || Win || align="left" | Mustapha Hamiche || French Kickboxing Championships FFKB A-Class, Semi Final || Paris, France || Decision ||  ||
|-
|-  bgcolor="#CCFFCC"
| 2008 || Win || align="left" | Thomas Diagne || French Kickboxing Championships FFKB A-Class, Final 8 || Paris, France || Decision || 4 ||
|-
|-  bgcolor="#CCFFCC"
| 2007-12-08 || Win || align="left" | Jordan Gomez || Full Night I ||Agde, France || TKO (broken jaw) || 2 || 
|-

|-
|-  bgcolor="#FFBBBB"
| 2014-10-23 || Loss ||align=left| Khasan Khaliev || W.A.K.O European Championships 2014, Low-Kick Semi Finals -75 kg  || Bilbao, Spain || Decision (unanimous) || 3 || 2:00
|-
|-  bgcolor="#CCFFCC"
| 2014-10-21 || Win ||align=left| Jerzy Wronski || W.A.K.O European Championships 2014, Low-Kick First Round -75 kg  || Bilbao, Spain || Decision (unanimous) || 3 || 2:00

|-  bgcolor="#cfc"
| 2010-09- || Win||align=left| Alpay Kır ||  2010 World Combat Games Kickboxing Low-Kick (-75 kg), Final || Beijing, China || Decision  || 3 || 2:00
|-
! style=background:white colspan=9 |

|-  bgcolor="#FFBBBB"
| 2009-10-25 || Loss ||align=left| Alpay Kır || World KickBoxing Championship WAKO || Villach, Austria || Decision (2-1) || 3 || 2:00
|-
! style=background:white colspan=9 |
|-
|-  bgcolor="#CCFFCC"
| 2009-10-23 || Win ||align=left| Kanan Sadikhov || World KickBoxing Championship WAKO, Semi Final || Villach, Austria || Decision (3-0) || 3 || 2:00
|-
|-  bgcolor="#CCFFCC"
| 2009-10-23 || Win ||align=left| Kumar Jaliev || World KickBoxing Championship WAKO, Quarter Final || Villach, Austria || Decision (3-0) || 3 || 2:00
|-
|-  bgcolor="#CCFFCC"
| 2009-10-21 || Win ||align=left| Pinherio Leonardo || World KickBoxing Championship WAKO, Final 8 || Villach, Austria || KO || 1 || 2:00
|-
|-
|-  bgcolor="#FFBBBB"
| 2008-11-26 || Loss ||align=left| Luka Simic || European Kickboxing Championships, Final 8 || Guimarães, Portugal || Decision ||  || 
|-

See also
List of male kickboxers

References

External links
Glory profile

1981 births
Living people
French male karateka
Moroccan male karateka
French male kickboxers
Moroccan male kickboxers
Middleweight kickboxers
French male mixed martial artists
Mixed martial artists utilizing karate
People from Meaux
French sportspeople of Moroccan descent
Breakdancers
Glory kickboxers
Sportspeople from Seine-et-Marne